The Senate is the upper chamber of Parliament in Burundi. It consists of between 39 and 56 members who serve 5-year terms. The current Senate was elected on 20 July 2020 and consists of 39 members.

In each of the country's 18 provinces, two Senators (one Hutu and one Tutsi) are chosen by electoral colleges of communal councilors. Voting takes place using a three round system. In the first two rounds, a candidate must receive a supermajority of two-thirds of the vote to be elected. If no candidate is elected in these rounds, a third round is organized for the two leading candidates, of which the candidate receiving the majority of votes is elected. Three Senators represent the Twa ethnic group and additional members may be co-opted to meet the 30% gender representation quota for women. Former heads of state are Senators by right.

History
A provision of establishment of Senate was in the 1962 constitution of the Kingdom of Burundi, however, the body was only established in 1965. The Senate was disestablished in 1966 after the coup of Michel Micombero. The Senate was re-established in 2001 following Arusha Accords.

Senate elections took place on 29 July 2005. The National Council for the Defense of Democracy-Forces for the Defense of Democracy (CNDD-FDD), which obtained the majority of seats in communal elections held in June, won an overwhelming majority (30) of the seats. The Front for Democracy in Burundi (FRODEBU) won 3 seats, while the remaining seat went the National Council for the Defense of Democracy (CNDD), a breakaway faction of the CNDD-FDD. Four former heads of state - Jean-Baptiste Bagaza (PARENA), Pierre Buyoya (UPRONA), Sylvestre Ntibantunganya (FRODEBU), and the current transitional president Domitien Ndayizeye (FRODEBU) will occupy seats in the Senate along with three Twa members. In order to meet the 30% quota for women, eight seats were co-opted giving the chamber of total of 49 seats.

On 19 August 2005, the Senate and National Assembly (acting as an Electoral College) elected Pierre Nkurunziza president of the republic. He took office on 26 August 2005.

Gervais Rufyikiri, a member of the CNDD-FDD, was elected president of the Senate on 17 August 2005. On 25 June 2015, he fled the country saying he felt threatened after opposing President Nkurunziza's bid for a third term. His replacement, Révérien Ndikuriyo, has made remarks comparing political opponents to cockroaches, similar to what politicians did during the Rwandan genocide, raising fears of another genocide.

See also
List of legislatures by country
List of presidents of the Senate of Burundi
Legislative branch
National Assembly (Burundi), the other branch of Burundi's Parliament

References

1965 establishments in Burundi
2001 establishments in Burundi
Government of Burundi
Burundi